, formerly , is a private university at Ogaki, Gifu, Japan, founded in 1967.

References

External links
 Official website  

Educational institutions established in 1967
Private universities and colleges in Japan
Universities and colleges in Gifu Prefecture
Ōgaki